Capitol Crisis was a DC Punk zine created by musician and DJ, Xyra Harper.

The zine was popular in the late 1970s and was part of the foundation for the new emerging music scene. The zine would often include reviews for different bands and songs in the area sent in by readers. Towards the back of each issue, questions sent in by readers would be answered by creator Xyra Harper in a section called "Ask Auntie Xyra", these questions had a variety of topics ranging from music taste to life advice..

It is in the special collection at the University of Maryland, College Park. It was part of the “Persistent Vision” exhibit there.

References

External links 
 Capitol Crisis, Number 1
 Capitol Crisis, Number 5

Punk zines